Daviesia schwarzenegger is a species of flowering plant in the family Fabaceae and is endemic to south-eastern continental Australia. It is a dense, mounded shrub with sharply-pointed phyllodes and yellow and dark red flowers, and resembles Daviesia devito apart from its more robust growth habit and the surface of its dried foliage.

Description
The branchlets and phyllodes are ribbed when dry, unlike those of D. devito that are wrinkled.

Taxonomy and naming
In 1982, Michael Crisp described Daviesia benthamii subsp. humilis in the Journal of the Adelaide Botanic Gardens, but in 2017, he and others divided that subspecies into two new species, D. schwarzenegger and D. devito in the journal Phytotaxa. The specific epithets (devito and schwarzenegger) are references to the main actors in the Universal Studios 1988 film Twins, D. devito being the less vigorous of the two. The authors also acknowledged Arnold Schwarzenegger's "pioneering the reduction of carbon emissions and for advising the Australian government to do the same".

Distribution and habitat
Daviesia schwarzenegger grows in mallee and woodland in scattered populations from the Eyre Peninsula in South Australia, to the area between Charlton and Rushworth in Victoria, and to near Condobolin in New South Wales.

References

schwarzenegger
Flora of South Australia
Flora of Victoria (Australia)
Flora of New South Wales
Plants described in 2017
Taxa named by Michael Crisp
Arnold Schwarzenegger